Ferencz Ambruş (born 2 March 1930, date of death unknown) was a Romanian  light-welterweight boxer. He competed at the 1952 Summer Olympics, but was eliminated in the second bout. He won two Romanian National Amateur Boxing Championship at the light-welterweight division in 1948 and 1949.

References

1930 births
Year of death missing
Sportspeople from Cluj-Napoca
Boxers at the 1952 Summer Olympics
Olympic boxers of Romania
Romanian male boxers
Light-welterweight boxers